West Roxbury is an MBTA Commuter Rail station in Boston, Massachusetts. It serves the Needham Line. It is located on an embankment above Lagrange Street in the West Roxbury neighborhood. The station is accessible with a short mini-high platform on the outbound end of the main platform.

History

The Boston and Providence Railroad (B&P) opened a branch line from Forest Hills to Dedham (where it connected with the B&P's preexisting branch to Dedham via Readville) via West Roxbury on June 3, 1850. South Street (Roslindale), Central (Bellevue), West Roxbury, and Spring Street stations all opened with the branch. The New Haven Railroad, successor to the B&P, opened the Needham cutoff on November 4, 1906 from West Roxbury to Needham Junction, allowing trains from the former New York and New England Railroad to reach Boston without needing to use the Boston and Albany Railroad's Highland branch. Service to Dedham via West Roxbury ended in 1940, leaving West Roxbury an intermediate station on the commuter lines to Needham and West Medway.

The entire Needham line was closed from 1979 to 1987 while the Southwest Corridor was reconstructed. During that time, most of the stations (including West Roxbury) were renovated for accessibility.

References

External links

 MBTA - West Roxbury
 Google Maps Street View: Lagrange Street entrance, Elgin Street entrance

MBTA Commuter Rail stations in Boston
Former New York, New Haven and Hartford Railroad stations
Railway stations in the United States opened in 1850